Dulwich Library opened on 24 November 1897. It is an example of a Passmore Edwards library  and is located at No. 368 Lordship Lane in East Dulwich, southeast London, England.

The Library is managed by Southwark Council. The library has been listed Grade II on the National Heritage List for England since March 2016.

The library was designed by Charles Barry Jr. in his capacity as architect and surveyor to Dulwich College, who donated the site on which the library stands. It was built as a memorial to the Elizabethan actor Edward Alleyn, the founder of Dulwich College and Alleyn's School. The foundation stone of the library was laid by the prominent actor Henry Irving on 24 September 1896, and the library was subsequently opened by the Lord Chancellor, Lord Halsbury, on 24 November 1897.

History
The library was opened on 24 November 1897 after the site was donated by Dulwich College. The library opened with a stock of 10,152 books.

References

External links
 Dulwich Library website

1897 establishments in England
1897 in London
Library
Grade II listed buildings in the London Borough of Southwark
Grade II listed library buildings
Library buildings completed in 1897
Libraries in the London Borough of Southwark
Public libraries in London
Charles Barry Jr. buildings